Philharmania is an album produced, arranged and conducted by Mike Batt in 1998. Performers included the Royal Philharmonic Orchestra and guest singers including Roger Daltrey, Marc Almond, Bonnie Tyler, Status Quo, Huey Lewis, Kim Wilde, Lemmy, Justin Hayward, and others. The album was recorded at Abbey Road Studios.

Track listing

Midge Ure "Vienna" (Ure/Currie/Allen/Cann) Polygram Music
Bonnie Tyler "I Put A Spell On You" (Hawkins) EMI Music Publishing
Roger Daltrey "Boys of Summer" (Henley/Campbell) Warner/Chappell Music
Joey Tempest "Born to Run" (Springsteen) Bruce Springsteen Music
Status Quo "Not Fade Away" (Hardin/Petty) Melody Lane Publishers/MPL Communications
Marc Almond "Paint It Black" (Jagger/Richards) Westminster Music/ABKCO Music
Paul Carrack "No Face, No Name, No Number" (Winwood/Capaldi) Warner Chappell/Island Music
John Farnham "A Whiter Shade Of Pale" (Reid/Booker) Onward Music
Justin Hayward "Nights In White Satin" (Hayward) Tyler Music
Lemmy "Eve Of Destruction" (P.F. Sloane) MCA Music Publishing
Kim Wilde "Because The Night" (Smith/Springsteen) Zomba Music Publishing
Colin Blunstone "Owner Of A Lonely Heart" (Anderson/Rabin/Squire/Horn) Warner/Chappell/Unforgettable Songs/Carling Music
Mike Batt "Bright Eyes" (Batt) EMI Music Publishing
Huey Lewis "The Power Of Love" (Lewis/Hayes/Colla) MCA Music Publishing

Musicians
Royal Philharmonic Orchestra
Drums: Ray Cooper, Henry Spinetti
Guitars: Chris Spedding, Mitch Dalton  
Bass Guitar: Tim Harries
Lead Saxophone: Phil Todd
Piano: Mike Batt
Backing vocals: Mike Batt, David Bevan, George Michael, Carol Kenyon, Tessa Niles, Miriam Stockley

References

1998 albums
Albums produced by Mike Batt